Stella Maris is a 1925 American silent drama film directed by Charles Brabin, written by Mary Alice Scully and based on a William J. Locke's 1913 novel. The film is a remake of the 1918 version, starring Mary Pickford.

Plot
Stella Maris was born paralyzed and has lived all of her life in her bed in a London mansion. Her parents died and she was left a fortune by the aunt for whom she was named. She lives with her wealthy aunt and uncle who, along with a close family friend, Walter Herold, and first cousin, John Riska, do not want her to be exposed to all the bad things happening in the world. John and Walter frequently visit her.  Love grows between John and Stella Maris. John, however, has a dark secret of being trapped in an unhappy marriage with Louise. Louise wants a servant and hires orphan Unity Blake. Louise beats Unity up after an incident, which results in Louise being sent to jail. John decides to adopt Unity and takes care of her. This results in Unity falling in love with John as well, despite knowing they can never be a couple. When she gets older, Stella's condition is miraculously cured by a special surgical procedure. She is no longer confined to her room. When she is able to go out, she is disillusioned and angry with her family and friends who lied to her about the ugliness of the world. She is most upset that they didn't believe she was strong enough to handle the truth. The end has tragedy and happiness.

Cast

Preservation
A print of Stella Maris survives at UCLA Film and Television Archive. Outtakes from Stella Maris were preserved by the Academy Film Archive in 2016.

References

External links

Lobby poster (heritageAucitons or ha)

1925 films
1925 drama films
American black-and-white films
Silent American drama films
American silent feature films
Remakes of American films
Films based on British novels
Universal Pictures films
Films set in London
Films directed by Charles Brabin
1920s American films